is a Japanese racing driver who competed in junior open-wheel racing and sports car categories. She entered the 24 Hours of Le Mans four times, the 24 Hours of Daytona once and also raced in her native Japan in such series as the All-Japan Formula Three Championship and the Fuji Grand Champion Series. In 1991 she was part of the first all-female LeMans driving team, driving with Lyn St. James and Desiré Wilson.

Biography
Yoshikawa was born in Nagoya, Aichi Prefecture, Japan on 10 May 1954; her family owned a fruit and vegetable shop. She played softball until she became frustrated with her pitching methodology and is a high school dropout. Aged 20, Yoshikawa received an invitation from the brother-in-law of a motor racing driver to participate in an amateur event at the Suzuka Circuit in Mie Prefecture and went on to visit the track every weekend.

She obtained domestic Class A license in 1977 and she began her full-time racing career two years later. In 1980, Yoshikawa began racing in open-wheel racing cars. Yoshikawa did one race in 1981 at Suzuka (part of the ) and finished 16th in a Team Equip-fielded Oscar T3B-Toyota vehicle and went unclassified in that year's points standings.

During 1985 and 1986, Yoshkiawa entered three endurance sports car races that formed the Fuji Grand Champion Series in a MCS 5-BMW that was fielded by Maribu Motorsport. She placed 16th in the Fuji 300 km, 19th in the Fuji 250 km, failed to start the Fuji 200 Mile due to an accident and retired from the Fuji GC (Grand Champion) after a major crash during the practice session. She had become the first woman to participate in the GC Fuji event. Yoshikawa did not finish the 1988 Suzuka 1000km (part of the All Japan Sports Prototype Championship in a Hiro HRS3-Mazda car she shared with fellow Japanese Kouzou Okumura due to an accident. She entered but was not classified for the 1989 Fuji 1000km that she partook in Katayama Racing's GTP-class Mazda 757 shared with fellow Japanese Keiichi Mizutani and Kazuhiko Oda. In 1991, Yoshikawa raced both the 1991 Sugo 500km and the 1991 Fuji 1000km in a Spice SE90C with Hideo Fukuyama and Hideshi Matsuda, finishing eighth overall (first in the C1 category) and retiring, respectively. That year she joined with Lyn St. James and Desiré Wilson to establish the first all-female team at LeMans.

In 1992, she became the first Japanese women to race at the 24 Hours of Le Mans by obtaining a FIA Super S license, and she received media coverage in Japan as a result. Driving a Category 1-category Chamberlain Engineering Spice SE89C-Ford Cosworth with Jun Harada and Kenta Shimamura, Yoshikawa and her co-drivers were classified 15th overall and eighth in class. That same year, she, Divina Galica and Harada came seventh overall at the 1992 1000 km of Suzuka (part of the World Sportscar Championship). Yoshikawa went on to race the 1993 24 Hours of Daytona for the Tom Gloy Racing team. Sharing a Ford Mustang with Canadians Pieter Baljet and Ron Fellows as well as South Africa's Desiré Wilson, she placed 47th following a crash. She then failed to finish the 1993 24 Hours of Le Mans in Courage Compétition's C30LM-Porsche entry alongside Alessandro Gini and Carlos Moran due to an tyre failure that caused an accident. Yoshikawa, Gordon Kellett and Matsuda retired from the Suzuka 1000 km due to their Lotus Esprit Sport 300 overheating.

At the 1994 24 Hours of Le Mans she, Hurada and Masahiko Kondō did not reach enough distance to be classified in their LMP1/C90-category ADA Team Nippon-entered Porsche 962C GTi. Yoshikawa, Luciano Della Noce and Anders Olofsson's Strandell Motorsport Ferrari F40 was disqualified from the 1994 Suzuka 1000 km due to an illegal overtake. Her final appearance at Le Mans came in  when she, Kenny Acheson and Alain Ferté's LMGT1-category SARD-entered SARD MC8-R-Toyota failed due to clutch trouble. Yoshikawa spent the following ten years racing solely in Japan without much success. She became a motorsport advisor to Bridgestone and cared for stray cats in a rented home.

Career results

Complete 24 Hours of Le Mans results

References

External links
 
 
 

1954 births
Living people
Sportspeople from Nagoya
20th-century Japanese women
21st-century Japanese women
Japanese female racing drivers
Japanese Formula 3 Championship drivers
World Sportscar Championship drivers
24 Hours of Le Mans drivers
24 Hours of Daytona drivers